Death in Midsummer may refer to:

 Death in Midsummer (Mishima story), a 1952 short story by Yukio Mishima
 Death in Midsummer and Other Stories, a 1966 anthology of Yukio Mishima short stories
 Death in Midsummer, a single from the Deerhunter album Why Hasn't Everything Already Disappeared?